The National Treasury Management Agency (NTMA) is the agency that manages the assets and liabilities of the Government of Ireland. It was established on 1 December 1990 to borrow for the Central Fund and manage the national debt. Since then it has been expanded greatly, for example it now manages the National Pensions Reserve Fund and acts as Ireland's agent for the purchase of carbon credits.

The National Asset Management Agency was established in December 2009 under the aegis of the agency to handle the  Irish financial crisis and the deflation of the Irish property bubble.

Ireland Strategic Investment Fund (ISIF)
The NTMA also handles the €8.1 billion Ireland Strategic Investment Fund (ISIF), a sovereign wealth fund established on 22 December 2014.

See also
 Economic and Social Research Institute
 Irish Fiscal Advisory Council
 Department of Finance (Ireland)
 Modified gross national income (Irish replacement for GDP/GNP)

References

External links
 Official website

Politics of the Republic of Ireland
Economy of the Republic of Ireland
Public finance of Ireland